Eng or ENG may refer to:

Language and linguistics 
 Eng (letter), Ŋ ŋ
 En with descender, Ң ң
 eng, ISO 639-3 and ISO 639-2 code for English language
 Velar nasal, a phoneme

People 
 Eng (name), a given name and surname in various cultures

Places 
 Eng Lake, in Minnesota, United States
 ENG, FIFA country code for England
 Eng, Netherlands, a hamlet in the municipality of Altena, North Brabant
 Eng, Tyrol, an exclave in Tyrol, Austria

Other uses 
 E.N.G., a Canadian television drama
 Electronic news-gathering
 Electronystagmography
 Empty net goal
 Endoglin, a protein
 Engineer
 Engineering
 Engineering notation